Vat Purnima (also called Vat Savitri Vrat) is a Hindu celebration observed by married women in Nepal, North India and in the Western Indian states of Maharashtra, Goa, Kumaon, Gujarat. On this Purnima (full moon) during the three days of the month of Jyeshtha in the Hindu calendar (which falls in May–June in the Gregorian calendar), a married woman marks her love for her husband by tying a ceremonial thread around a banyan tree. The celebration is based on the legend of Savitri and Satyavan as narrated in the epic Mahabharata.

History

The legends dates back to a story in the age of Mahabharata. The childless king Asvapati and his consort Malavi wish to have a son. Finally, the God Savitr appears and tells him he will soon have a daughter. The king is overjoyed at the prospect of a child. She is born and named Savitri in honor of the god.

She is so beautiful and pure, and intimidates all the men in her village that no man will ask for her hand in marriage. Her father tells her to find a husband on her own. She sets out on a pilgrimage for this purpose and finds Satyavan, the son of a blind king named Dyumatsena who lives in exile as a forest-dweller. Savitri returns to find her father speaking with Sage Narada who tells her she has made a bad choice: although perfect in every way, Satyavan is destined to die one year from that day. Savitri insists on going ahead and marries Satyavan.

Three days before the foreseen death of Satyavan, Savitri takes a vow of fasting and vigil. Her father-in-law tells her she has taken on too harsh a regimen, but she replies that she has taken an oath to perform the regimen and Dyumatsena offers his support. The morning of Satyavan’s predicted death, he is splitting wood and suddenly becomes weak and lays his head in Savitri’s lap and dies. Savitri places his body under the shade of a Vat (Banyan) tree. Yama, the god of Death, comes to claim Satyavan's soul. Savitri follows him as he carries the soul away. 

She first asks for eyesight and restoration of the kingdom for her father-in-law, then a hundred children for her father, and then a hundred children for herself and Satyavan. The last wish creates a dilemma for Yama, as it would indirectly grant the life of Satyavan. However, impressed by Savitri's dedication and purity, he offers her one more chance to choose any boon, but this time omitting "except for the life of Satyavan". Savitri instantly asks for Satyavan to return to life. Yama grants life to Satyavan and blesses Savitri's life with eternal happiness.

Satyavan awakens as though he has been in a deep sleep and returns to his parents along with his wife. Meanwhile, at their home, Dyumatsena regains his eyesight before Savitri and Satyavan return. Since Satyavan still does not know what happened, Savitri relays the story to her parents-in-law, husband, and the gathered ascetics. As they praise her, Dyumatsena’s ministers arrive with news of the death of his usurper. Joyfully, the king and his entourage return to his kingdom.

Though the tree does not play a significant role of the story, it is worshiped in memory of the love in the legend.

Festival

Vat Purnima in English means a full moon related to the banyan tree. It is a Hindu festival celebrated strictly in the Northern and Western Indian states Maharashtra, Goa, and Gujarat.  The period of the festival is observed over three days, usually the 13th, 14th and 15th days in the month of Jestha (May–June). Women observe a fast and tie threads around a banyan tree and pray for the well-being of their husbands.

Fast and tradition
On the occasion of Vat Purnima, women keep a fast of three days for their husbands, as Savitri did. During the three days, pictures of a Vat (banyan) tree, Savitri, Satyavan, and Yama, are drawn with a paste of sandal and rice on the floor or a wall in the home. The golden engravings of the couple are placed in a tray of sand, and worshiped with mantras (chanting), and Vat leaves. Outdoors, the banyan tree is worshiped. A thread is wound around the trunk of the tree, and copper coins are offered. Strict adherence to the fast and tradition is believed to ensure the husband a long and prosperous life. During the fast, women greet each other with "जन्म सावित्री हो" (English: "Become a Savitri"). It is believed that until the next seven births their husband will live well.

In his book, B. A. Gupte provides a Pauranic excerpt to suggest that the mythology behind the festival is symbolic of natural phenomena. He notes that it is the representation of the annual marriage of the earth and nature represented by Satyavan and Savitri. It is like the way the earth dies every year and is rejuvenated by the powers of nature. He points out that the Vat tree was likely chosen due to the mythological aspects connected to the tree that are known to Indians.

In the present day, the festival is celebrated in the following way. Women dress in fine sarees and jewelry, and their day begins with the offering of any five fruits and a coconut. Each woman winds white thread around a banyan tree seven times as a reminder of their husbands. They fast for the whole day.

Notes
Footnotes

Citations

References

Religious festivals in India
Hindu festivals
May observances
June observances
Festivals in Maharashtra
Observances held on the full moon
Hindu festivals in India
Observances set by the Vikram Samvat calendar